This article records new taxa of every kind of fossil archosaur that are scheduled to be described during 2023, as well as other significant discoveries and events related to the paleontology of archosaurs that will be published in 2023.

Pseudosuchians

New pseudosuchian taxa

General pseudosuchian research

Aetosaur research 
 A study on the humeral histology in specimens of Aetosaurus ferratus from the Kaltental site (Lower Stubensandstein, Germany) is published by Teschner et al. (2023), who interpret the studied specimens as juveniles, and interpret the accumulation of small-sized specimens at Kaltental as possible evidence of gregarious behavior in juveniles of A. ferratus.

Crocodylomorph research 
 Evidence from the osteological correlates of the trigeminal nerve in extant and fossil taxa, interpreted as indicative of an increase in sensory abilities in Early Jurassic crocodylomorphs, preceding their transitions to a semiaquatic habitat, is presented by Lessner et al. (2023).
 New specimen of Hsisosuchus of uncertain specific assignment, providing new information on the shape and arrangement of the osteoderms in the ventral trunk shield of members of this genus, is described from the Upper Jurassic of Yunnan (China) by Wu et al. (2023).
 A study on possible effects of climate, body size and diet on the survival of terrestrial notosuchians during the Cretaceous–Paleogene extinction event is published by Aubier et al. (2023), who find evidence of increase in body size during the Late Cretaceous which may be related to the shift from omnivorous to carnivorous diet, but find the studied data insufficient to list definitive reasons for the survival of sebecids into the Cenozoic.
 Description of new fossil material of itasuchid crocodyliforms from the Upper Cretaceous Bauru Group (Brazil) is published by Pinheiro et al. (2023), who also confirm the monophyly of Itasuchidae with some variation in its content, and find the South American itasuchid species to occupy a crocodyliform morphospace, possibly indicating distinct niche occupations.
 A study on the neuroanatomy and phylogenetic affinities of Portugalosuchus azenhae is published by Puértolas-Pascual et al. (2023), who recover Portugalosuchus as a member of Gavialoidea most closely related to Thoracosaurus neocesariensis.
A collection of isolated gavialoid teeth is reported from the shallow marine deposits of Eocene Turnu Roșu (Romania) by Venczel  et al. (2023), who recognize a minimum of five morphotypes.
 Burke & Mannion (2023) present a reconstruction of the neuroanatomy and neurosensory apparatus of "Tomistoma" dowsoni, providing evidence that this gavialoid displayed an intermediate morphology between those of extant gharials and false gharials.
A collection of eighteen isolated neosuchian teeth as well as a single isolated crocodyliform osteoderm are reported from the Berriasian–Valanginian Feliz Deserto Formation (Brazil) by Lacerda et al. (2023), who recognize a minimum of three morphotypes among the teeth.

Non-avian dinosaurs

New dinosaur taxa

General non-avian dinosaur research 
 Cullen et al. (2023) reevaluate evidence for anomalously positive stable carbon isotope compositions of dinosaur bioapatite, report that the studied anomaly is present in the carbon isotope compositions of bioapatite in tooth enamel of not only dinosaurs but also mammals and crocodilians and in scale ganoine of gars from the "Rainy Day Site" in the Campanian Oldman Formation (Alberta, Canada) but is absent in extant vertebrates from the near-analogue modern ecosystem in the Atchafalaya Basin (Louisiana, United States), and interpret their findings as indicating that the studied anomaly is not the result of a unique dietary physiology of dinosaurs.
 Dinosaur eggshell fragments with preserved eggshell membranes are reported from the Late Jurassic Brushy Basin Member of the Morrison Formation (Utah, United States) by Lazer et al. (2023).
 Navarro-Lorbés et al. (2023) describe tracks produced by an undetermined bipedal non-avian dinosaur from the Lower Cretaceous Cameros Basin (Spain), interpreted as likely produced during swimming, and providing information on the swimming behaviour of the trackmaker.
Description of four dinosaur teeth assignable to three different families (Tyrannosauroidea, Titanosauriformes, and Hadrosauroidea) from the Creataceous Sunjiawan Formation (China) is published by Yin et al. (2023), representing the first record of a theropod from the formation, as well as representing potentially two new taxa, as the hadrosauroid teeth are distinct from Shuangmiaosaurus.

Saurischian research 
 A tracksite of dinosaur footprints is described from the Middle Jurassic Xietan Formation (Hubei, China) by Xing et al. (2023), who interpret the tracks as belonging to small sauropods (similar to Brontopodus) and probable theropods.

Theropod research 
 A study on the developmental strategies underlying the evolution of body size of non-avialan theropods is published by D'Emic et al. (2023), who report that changes in the rate and duration of growth contributed nearly equally to the body size changes.
 A study on the relationship between the body size of theropods, the area of muscles important for their balance and locomotion, and their capacity for agility is published by Henderson (2023), who argues that theropod body plan had an upper size limit based on a minimum acceleration threshold.
 Peng et al. (2023) describe abundant tracks from the Upper Triassic Tianquan track site (Xujiahe Formation; Ya'an, western Sichuan Basin, China), interpreted as produced by small theropods and representing one of the earliest record of dinosaurs from the eastern Tethys realm.
 Sharma, Hendrickx & Singh (2023) describe dental material of a non-coelurosaur averostran theropod from the Bathonian Fort Member of the Jaisalmer Formation (India), providing evidence of the presence of at least one taxon of a medium to large-bodied theropod on the Tethyan coast of India during the Middle Jurassic.
 A collection of seven isolated spinosaurid teeth as well as a single preungual pedal phalanx of an indetermined theropod are reported from the Berriasian–Valanginian Feliz Deserto Formation (Brazil) by Lacerda et al. (2023).
 Barker et al. (2023) reconstruct the endocasts of the baryonychine spinosaurids Baryonyx walkeri and Ceratosuchops inferodios, finding their morphology to be similar to non-maniraptoriform theropods despite their highly modified skulls.
Description of a pathological tooth of Spinosaurus from the Late Cretaceous Ifezouane Formation (Morocco) is published by Smith and Martill (2023), representing the first record of external dental pathology in a spinosaurine spinosaurid.
 Reconstruction of the musculature of the pectoral girdle and forelimbs in megaraptoran theropods is presented by Aranciaga Rolando et al. (2023).
 A pathological third metatarsal of Phuwiangvenator, indicating that the bone experienced a greenstick fracture and healed before the animal's death, is described from the Lower Cretaceous Sao Khua Formation (Khon Kaen, Thailand) by Samathi et al. (2023).
 A study estimating the number of telencephalic neurons in theropod dinosaurs is published by Herculano-Houzel (2023), who argues that Allosaurus and Tyrannosaurus are endotherms with baboon- and monkey-like numbers of neurons; however, this study has been criticized.
 The study suggesting that carnosaurs like Allosaurus were primarily scavengers that fed on sauropod carcasses, originally published by Pahl and Ruedas (2021) is criticized by Kane et al. (2023) but later defended by Pahl and Ruehdas (2023).
 Evidence of preservation of elements associated with bone remodeling and redeposition (sulfur, calcium, zinc) in a specimen of Tyrannosaurus rex, interpreted as indicative of preservation of original endogenous chemistry in the studied specimen, is presented by Anné et al. (2023).
 A study on the formation and function of the enlarged unguals of alvarezsauroid and therizinosaur theropods is published by Qin et al. (2023), who interpret their findings as indicative of the evolution of digging adaptions in late-diverging alvarezsauroids, find the unguals of early-branching therizinosaurs to perform well in piercing and pulling, and interpret the enlarged unguals of Therizinosaurus as not adapted to functions that required considerable stress-bearing.
 Two ornithomimid pedal phalanges are described from the Late Cretaceous Fox Hills Formation (South Dakota, United States) by Chamberlain, Knoll, and Sertich (2023), representing the first dinosaur skeletal material from the formation.
 Smith & Gillette (2023) reconstruct soft tissues of the hindlimbs and likely posture of Nothronychus graffami.
 A partial left tibia and articulated proximal tarsals, likely belonging to an indeterminate velociraptorine, are described from the Upper Cretaceous Lo Hueco fossil site (Cuenca, Spain) by Malafaia et al. (2023), who also review the European theropods of the Late Cretaceous.
 Averianov & Lopatin (2023) describe new fossil material of Kansaignathus sogdianus from the Santonian Ialovachsk Formation (Tajikistan), and confirm the phylogenetic placement of K. sogdianus as the basalmost Asiatic velociraptorine.

Sauropodomorph research 
 Lockley et al. (2023) evaluate a number of trackways assigned to basal saurischians, including those belonging to the ichnogenera Otozoum, Pseudotetrasauropus, Evazoum, and Kalosauropus, and examine their implications on the gait of "prosauropods".
Description of new eusauropod fossil material from the Middle Jurassic Dongdaqiao Formation (China) is published by Wei et al. (2023), who interpret these findings as showing that gigantic sauropods were more widespread than previously known during the Middle Jurassic.
 The holotype of Mamenchisaurus sinocanadorum is redescribed by Moore et al. (2023), who also interpret Bellusaurus and Daanosaurus as juvenile mamenchisaurids.
 Cervical vertebra representing the first record of a titanosauriform sauropod from the Lower Cretaceous Kanmon Group (Japan) is described by Tatehata, Mukunoki & Tanoue (2023).
 Dhiman et al. (2023) report the discovery of 92 titanosaur egg clutches from the Upper Cretaceous Lameta Formation (Madhya Pradesh, India), including three types of clutches and assigned to six oospecies, interpret their findings as suggestive of higher diversity of titanosaur taxa from the Lameta Formation than indicated by body fossils, and evaluate the implications of the studied egg clutches for the knowledge of the reproductive biology of titanosaurs.

Ornithischian research 
 A study on the biomechanical properties of the skulls of Heterodontosaurus tucki, Lesothosaurus diagnosticus, Scelidosaurus harrisonii, Hypsilophodon foxii and Psittacosaurus lujiatunensis is published by Button et al. (2023), who interpret their findings as indicative of limited functional convergence among studied taxa, which achieved comparable performance of the feeding apparatus through different adaptations.
 A study on the evolution of forelimb muscle mechanics and function in ornithischian dinosaurs is published by Dempsey et al. (2023), who interpret their findings as indicating that thyreophorans, ornithopods and ceratopsians evolved quadrupedality through different patterns of rearrangement of forelimb musculature.
 Review of the fossil record of ornithischian dinosaurs from Southeast Asia and southern China is published by Manitkoon et al. (2023)
 Surmik et al. (2023) study ossified tendons of specimens of Pinacosaurus grangeri, Edmontosaurus regalis/"Ugrunaaluk kuukpikensis" and Homalocephale calathocercos, reporting the presence of collagenous fibre bundles and likely fibril bundles, blood vessels and associated cells in some of the studied samples, and argue that ossified tendons can be a source of molecular preservation in dinosaurs.

Thyreophoran research 
 A study on the use of quadrapediality in Scutellosaurus lawleri, and on its implications for locomotor behavior evolution in dinosaurs,  is published by Anderson et al. (2023), who interpret Scutellosaurus as mainly being a biped, and suggest quadrapediality was used during specific activities.
 Galton (2023) describes a right sternal bone of a specimen of Stegosaurus from the Carnegie Quarry at Dinosaur National Monument (Morrison Formation; Utah, United States) and reevaluates three putative sternal bones from Como Bluff (Wyoming, United States) described by Gilmore (1914), arguing that they are neither sternal bones nor fossils of Stegosaurus.
Description of nodosaurid osteoderms from the Late Cretaceous Snow Hill Island Formation (Antarctica) is published by Brum et al. (2023), who suggest that osteoderm structure may have helped nodosaurids colonize high-latitude environments more easily.
 Yoshida, Kobayashi & Norell (2023) report the discovery of fossilized larynx of a specimen of Pinacosaurus grangeri from the Campanian of Ukhaa Tolgod (Mongolia), and interpret its anatomy as indicating that Pinacosaurus might have been capable of vocalization and, like extant birds, might have possessed a non-laryngeal vocal source and used larynx as a sound modifier.

Cerapod research 
 Redescription of Cumnoria prestwichii is published by Maidment et al. (2023), who recover Cumnoria as a non-ankylopollexian iguanodontian, and consider it to be distinct from Camptosaurus.
 García-Cobeña, Cobosa & Verdú (2023) describe bone and trace fossils of styracosternan ornithopods from the Lower Cretaceous El Castellar Formation and Camarillas Formation (Spain), including manus-pes track set from the Camarillas Formation indicative of quadrupedal locomotion, assigned to the ichnogenus Caririchnium and produced by large styracosternans related to Iguanodon.
 A study on the cranial suture interdigitation in Hadrosaurids, using data gathered from Gryposaurus and Corythosaurus is published by Dudgeon and Evans (2023) who find that suture interdigitation increased across Hadrosaurid ontogeny, that Lambeosaurines had higher suture interdigitation than other Iguanodontians, and that increased suture complexity coincided with Lambeosaurine crest evolution.
 A study on the anatomy of the holotype specimen of Gravitholus albertae is published by Dyer, Powers & Currie (2023), who interpret both Gravitholus albertae and Hanssuesia sternbergi as likely junior synonyms of Stegoceras validum.
 A study on the endocranial morphology of Liaoceratops yanzigouensis is published by Yang et al. (2023), who find that the brain, olfactory bulb and inner ear of Liaoceratops more closely resemble those observed in Psittacosaurus than those in more derived ceratopsians.
 A review of the cranial evolution in Ceratopsia is published by Nabavizadeh (2023).

Birds

New bird taxa

Avian research 
 Five specimens of Sapeornis chaoyangensis with different-preserved feathers are reported from the Early Cretaceous Jehol Biota (China) by Zhao et al. (2023), who examine their implications for the taphonomy of soft tissues from the Jehol Biota.
 A study aiming to determine the diets of members of the family Pengornithidae is published by Miller et al. (2023), who report that Pengornis, Parapengornis and Yuanchuavis show adaptations for vertebrate carnivory.
 Wang (2023) describes a new specimen of Parabohaiornis martini with a well-preserved skull from the Lower Cretaceous Jiufotang Formation (China), and reports the presence of the plesiomorphic temporal and palatal configurations (similar to those of non-avian dinosaurs) in the skull of Parabohaiornis.
 Lowi-Merri et al. (2023) provide evidence of soaring and foot-propelled swimming capabilities of Ichthyornis.
 Buffetaut (2023) reports the discovery of a plaster cast of the lost femur of Struthio anderssoni from the late Pleistocene deposits of the Upper Cave at Zhoukoudian (China), and transfers the species S. anderssoni to the genus Pachystruthio.
 A study on the evolutionary history of the elephant birds, based on data from fossil eggshells, is published by Grealy et al. (2023), who interpret their findings as supporting the placement of Mullerornis into a separate family, as well as indicative of the existence of a genetically distinct lineage of Aepyornis in Madagascar's far north, report evidence of divergence within Aepyornis corresponding with the onset of the Quaternary, and tentatively advocate synonymising Vorombe titan with Aepyornis maximus.
 Figueiredo et al. (2023) report a partial coracoid of the genus Morus from the middle Miocene (Langhian) of the Setúbal Peninsula (Portugal), an instance that represents the first Miocene sulid described from the Iberian Peninsula.
 A study on the phylogenetic affinities of vastanavids and messelasturids, incorporating data from new fossil specimens from the Eocene London Clay (Essex, United Kingdom), is published by Mayr & Kitchener (2023).

Pterosaurs

New pterosaur taxa

Pterosaur research 
 A study on the diversification of pterosaurs during their evolutionary history, aiming to determine the factors that affected pterosaur evolution, is published by Yu, Zhang & Xu (2023).
 Revision of the pterosaur assemblage from the Kem Kem Group (Morocco) is published by Smith et al. (2023), who provide revised diagnoses for Afrotapejara zouhrii and Alanqa saharica, and report at least three distinct jaw morphotypes which cannot be referred to any previously named species.
 Description of the pectoral girdle morphology and histology in Hamipterus, providing evidence of both the similarities and differences between the flight apparatus of pterosaurs and birds, is published by Wu et al. (2023).
 A study on the affinities of "Tupuxuara" deliradamus is published by Cerqueira, Müller & Pinheiro (2023), who interpret this pterosaur as a tapejarine.

Other archosaurs

Other archosaur research

General research 
 Wang, Claessens & Sullivan (2023) establish skeletal features associated with the attachment of uncinate processes to vertebral ribs in extant birds and crocodilians, attempt to determine their distribution in fossil archosaurs, and interpret their findings as indicating that cartilaginous uncinate processes were plesiomorphically present (and likely had a ventilatory function) in dinosaurs, and maybe even in archosaurs in general.

References 

Archosaurs
2023 in paleontology